Trần Bá Dương (born 1960 in Huế) is a Vietnamese entrepreneur. He is the founder of Vietnamese automobile producer THACO. In addition, he is also known as the General Director of Dai Quang Minh Real Estate Investment Joint Stock Company.

Biography
Dương was born in 1960 in Huế. He graduated with a degree in mechanical engineering from Ho Chi Minh City University of Technology in 1983.

He started his career by working as a repair technician at Dong Nai auto repair factory. He then gradually worked his way up to a managing position.

In 1997, he founded THACO, which has grown to become the largest automobile producer in Vietnam.

In 2013, he stepped down as CEO of THACO, but retained his position as the company's chairman.

Dương and his family hold a major share in THACO.

As of March 2018, Dương was recognized by Forbes to own a total fortune of 1.76 billion USD. According to Forbes' documentation, by 2016, Thaco was the largest automobile company in Vietnam - with a market share of 32%.

References

Vietnamese businesspeople
1960 births
Living people
Vietnamese billionaires
Vietnamese business executives
People from Thừa Thiên-Huế province